Fahmy is a given name. Notable people with the name include:

Aly Fahmy Mohammed Aly Fahmi, Commander of the Egyptian Air Defense Forces and son of Mohammed Aly Fahmy
Azza Fahmy, Egyptian jewellery designer
Hussein Fahmy, Egyptian actor
Ismail Fahmi or Fahmi, Egyptian Foreign Minister from 1973 to 1977
Joud Fahmy, Saudi judoka
Mohammed Aly Fahmy, Chief of Staff of the Egyptian Armed Forces and participant in multiple armed conflicts
Mohamed Fahmy, Egyptian-Canadian controversial author, journalist, and war correspondent
Mohamed Fahmy, Egyptian visual artist
Mourad Fahmy
Raed Fahmy Jahid, Iraqi Communist politician and Minister of Science and Technology from 2006 to 2010
Sonia Fahmy, computer scientist
Marguerite Alibert, or Princess Fahmy Bey, French courtesan and socialite